SupermodelMe is a multi-platform reality series in which a number aspiring models of Asian heritage compete for a chance to launch their career in the fashion industry.

Created by Karen Seah and produced by Refinery Media, SupermodelMe has run for three seasons and received nominations for "Best Cross-Platform Content" at the Asian Television Awards 2012 and "Best Non-Fiction" at the International Digital Emmy Awards in 2013.

The series was hosted by Singaporean model Charmaine Harn in its first two seasons. VJ and international Supermodel Lisa Selesner assumed the role of host from the third season onwards. The brand new season is presented by Cindy Bishop, a Thai model and the former host of Asia's Next Top Model.

Show format
Seasons 1 to 2 were 30-minute episodes and from Season 3, the show graduated to 60-minute episodes on cable, although on MediaCorp Channel 5, 30-minute episodes were specially produced. Throughout the series, the contestants are housed together under one roof and made to go through a series of tasks and photo-challenges, most of which bear a strong sporting and competitive angle. Each episode, one contestant is eliminated before a panel of judges until the winning model is chosen from a final three.

Transmedia presence
Supermodelme is an English language multi-platform, reality-based entertainment programme available across television, the internet and on mobile. Along with weekly television episodes, viewers can follow online webisodes that feature behind-the-scenes footage, extended footage and deleted scenes. Mobile content ranges from introductory biographies of the models to weekly "Confessional" videos. Supermodelme's cross-platform efforts earned it a nomination and "Highly Commended" position for "Best Cross-Platform Content" at the Asian Television Awards 2012, coming in behind CNN-IBN's "The Citizen Journalist Show".

Other technology integration
In 2010, Supermodelme became the first television showout of Asia to ink a deal with popular location-based application Foursquare. The collaboration saw the integration of brands such as DKNY Jeans, with followers of the branded Supermodelme game rewarded with discounts for every virtual ‘Check-In’. In 2011, Refinery Media entered into a partnership with Google's YouTube to distribute Supermodelme content on its site. Refinery Media also pioneered the use of “Hyperspot technology” with its integration into the show's website Supermodelme.tv. The use of “Hyperspot technology” on Supermodelme.tv allowed viewers to attain immediate information and access to whatever brands, products etc. they saw on screen while watching content on the website.

Episodic breakdown

Each episode, the models undertake a sports or action-oriented task that pits them against one another in a bid to determine one winner. The winner may receive prizes, rewards or in some cases, extra camera shots or time in their Photo Challenges. Following each task is a Photo Challenge, which is the key elimination element of the show. Here, the contestants are given a set number of camera shots to obtain their best picture for judging. The photo shoots require the utilization of skills acquired from the respective preceding physical tasks. After the photo challenge is over, the contestants will face Supermodelme's celebrity judging panel that will provide feedback on their performance and photographs and proceed to eliminate one contestant.

Judges

Series evolution
Season 1 of Supermodelme was initially produced for online consumption with 20 webisodes of 10–12 minute lengths and was broadcast on the website Supermodelme.tv. The show was subsequently picked up by cable channel AXN, reformatted for television broadcast and shown in 27 countries.

Season 2 saw Lionsgate's Celestial Tiger Entertainment co-produce Supermodelme for television broadcast in high definition. Weekly 30-minute episodes debuted on KIX and MediaCorp while the series retained its digital content and transmedia presence with accompanying webisodes and mobisodes.

Season 3 (Supermodel Me: Fast & Furious) of Supermodelme was co-produced through a tri-party deal between Celestial Tiger Entertainment, MediaCorp TV and Refinery Media. It saw the introduction of Lisa S., a new host.

Season 4 (Supermodel Me: Femme Fatale) and Season 5 (Supermodel Me: Sirens) have aired, launches on Diva (Asian TV channel) and Azio TV. Season 5 was take place in Malaysia.

The newest Season 6 (Supermodel Me: Revolution) started to air in October 2021 after a seven-year hiatus, with the shooting location being moved back to Singapore. The previous judging panel are mostly replaced by the judging panel of Asia's Next Top Model, with Thai model Cindy Bishop appointed as host and head judge, and Yu Tsai appointed as creative consultant. Ase Wang will return to the judging panel for the fourth time. The show will also mark as the debut of Catriona Gray and Hanli Hoefer in the show's judging panel. Asia's Next Top Model Dana Slosar and Monika Santa Maria were added as the task master.

Partnerships
In 2010 Celestial Tiger Entertainment, the Asian arm of Lionsgate, entered into a partnership with Refinery Media to produce Season 2 and 3 of Supermodelme while additionally securing the rights to broadcast Season 1.

It was announced in 2012 that Supermodelme would make its first foray into China through Sohu and Qiyi and the United States via MYX TV, with the network purchasing the rights to all three seasons of the series. In addition, Supermodelme announced in July 2012 a collaboration with Audi Fashion Festival (AFF) 2013 – the largest annual fashion event in Singapore.

Seasons

Contestants per country 
This is the list of each contestants that competed in Supermodel Me, each country has 1-3 representatives per edition.

Distributions
Supermodelme has distribution in 13 countries across the globe with a cable television reach of about 30 million people.
It is also available all over the world (except China) on Netflix, in original language (English) and subtitles.

References

External links
 
 
 

2009 Singaporean television series debuts
English-language television shows
Modeling-themed reality television series
Singaporean reality television series